Carmelo Galiano Cotes, better known as Galy Galiano (Chiriguaná, Cesar, Colombia, 10 February 1958), is a Colombian composer and singer of romantic and tropical music. He was the first Colombian artist to appear in Billboard with three songs in a single listing.

Biography 
He formed his first musical group Los Diamantes del Cesar with friends in the neighborhood where he played bass and composed songs. Later he met Cuban producer Ricardo Acosta, who gave him his stage name and recorded his first album.

Galy Galiano released in 1981 the album Frío de ausencia, of the ballad genre, with which he occupied the first places of the Billboard magazine for three consecutive months. The title of the album originated from a poem written by his father Orlando Galiano. In Guatemala, Galy Galiano received the "Dama de plata" award for the best selling album of the year.

In 1991 he ventured into salsa with the song "Cómo la quiero, cuánto la extraño.". In 1992 he appeared his work named "Solo Salsa" with which he was successful in the United States, Mexico, Central America, Venezuela, Ecuador and Colombia. In 1994, he won the Ronda Prize for the best-selling album in Venezuela.

In 1994 he returned to the genre of the ballad with the album "Amor de primavera" which got sales that passed the 400 thousand copies.

In 1996 he ventured into ranchera music with the album Me bebí tu recuerdo, which obtained sales of more than 500,000 copies and achieved the first places in the lists of that musical genre. Between 1997 and 1998 he released two more productions of ranchera music: Bebiendo para olvidar y No volveré a casarme, which led him to tour Central and South America.

In 2013, he was in Honduras promoting his album Galy Galiano 30 years.

He currently resides in Chia, Cundinamarca.

Discography 

 1981: Frío De Ausencia - Cold Of Absence 
 1981: Galy Galiano  
 1983: Alma Solitaria - Lonely soul 
 1985: A Manos Llenas - Hand over fist
 1986: Brindemos - We offer
 1988: Celoso - Jealous 
 1990: Dos Corazones - Two Hearts
 1991: Tu Amor Es Fuego - Your Love Is Fire
 1992: Solo Salsa -  Just Salsa
 1993: Tres Palabras - Three Words
 1993: Sin Fronteras - Without Borders
 1994: Mi Son Latino - My Son Latino
 1994: Amor De Primavera - Spring Love
 1996: Me Bebí Tu Recuerdo - I Drink Your Memory
 1997: Deseos - Wishes
 1997: Bebiendo Para Olvidar - Drinking To Forget
 1998: No Volveré A Casarme - : I Will Not Get Married Again
 2000: Galy Galiano
 2001: El Sentimental De La Salsa  - The Sentimental Of The Salsa
 2004: La Otra Cara De La Moneda - The Other Side Of The Currency
 2006: Las clásicas de Galy Galiano - Galy Galiano's classics
 2006: Un Solo Sentimiento - A Single Feeling
 2010: Galy
 2013: 30 Años - 30 Years
 2016: De Gala - with Gala costume

Singles

 2014: Mi Obsesión - My obsession
 2016: Felices los 5 . Happy the 5 people

Notes:

Works based on his life 

 In 2016, the telenovela Todo es prestao, based on the life of Galy Galiano, is broadcast on the Colombian channel RCN.

References 

Spanish-language singers
20th-century Colombian male singers
People from Cesar Department
Colombian composers
Colombian pop singers
21st-century Colombian male singers